Johannes Hofer (born 3 August 1983) is an Italian luger who has competed since 2002. A natural track luger, he won two medals at the 2005 FIL World Luge Natural Track Championships in Latsch, Italy with a silver in the men's doubles and a bronze in the mixed team events.

References
FIL-Luge profile
Natural track World Championships results: 1979-2007

External links
 

1983 births
Italian male lugers
Living people
Italian lugers
People from Moos in Passeier
Sportspeople from Südtirol